Rhanerbräu is one of the five oldest German breweries with continuous beer production located in Schönthal-Rhan, Cham district in Bavaria federal state. First mentioned in 1283, it is managed by the Bruckmayer family since 1776.

In the spring of 2009, the heat supply of the entire brewery was converted to regenerative energy source. In the "Rhaner Bierkist'l", a building in the form of the world's largest beer cell, a directional biomass heating center is being built that provides process heat in the form of high-pressure steam -neutral for all operating parts.

See also 
List of oldest companies

References

External links 
Homepage in German
Profile on Bier Universum (German)

Breweries in Germany
Beer brands of Germany
13th-century establishments in the Holy Roman Empire